The 2005–06 season saw Falkirk compete in the Scottish Premier League where they finished in 10th position with 33 points.

Final league table

Results
Falkirk's score comes first

Legend

Scottish Premier League

Scottish Cup

Scottish League Cup

References

External links
 Falkirk 2005–06 at Soccerbase.com (select relevant season from dropdown list)

Falkirk F.C. seasons
Falkirk